Events from the year 1897 in Denmark.

Incumbents
 Monarch – Christian IX
 Prime minister – Tage Reedtz-Thott (until 23 May), Hugo Egmont Hørring

Events
 29 May – St. Luke's Church in Frederiksberg is consecrated as the first new church to be built to relieve the pressure on Frederiksberg Church in the fast-growing Frederiksberg district of Copenhagen.
 11 June — 1897 Gentofte train crash
 7 August — Cabinet of Hørring is formed by Hugo Egmont Hørring of the conservative party Højre after Tage Reedtz-Thott's resignation as Council President,

Undated

Sports
 12 June  Aarhus Fremad is founded.
 30 July  2 August  Edwin Schraeder wins a gold medal in men's sprint at the amateur event of the  1897 ICA Track Cycling World Championships.

Births
 February – Erling Foss, engineer, businessman (died 1982)
 29 August – Helge Rosvaenge, singer (died 1972)
 29 October – Sigurd Langberg, actor (died 1954)
 9 November – Arthur Jensen, actor (died 1981)
 31 December – Liva Weel, actress (died 1952)

Deaths
 11 February – Christen Dalsgaard, painter (born 1824)
 30 April – Carsten Henrichsen, painter (born 1824)
 20 June  – Johannes Steenstrup, natural scientist (born 1813)

References

 
1890s in Denmark
Denmark
Years of the 19th century in Denmark